is a senior high school in Funabashi, Chiba, Japan. That year it had 955 students; these students originated from about 100 junior high schools.

References

External links
Funabashi Keimei High School 
English information

High schools in Chiba Prefecture
2011 establishments in Japan
Educational institutions established in 2011